Francisco Javier Fernández Torrejón (born August 19, 1975) is a former Chilean football player, who played for clubs of Chile and Japan, the Chile national U-20 football team and the Chile national football team.

Honours

Player
 Colo-Colo
Primera División de Chile (3): 1996, 1997 Clausura, 1998
Copa Chile (1): 1994

References

External links
 
 
 

1975 births
Living people
Footballers from Santiago
Chilean footballers
Chilean expatriate footballers
Chile international footballers
Chilean Primera División players
Colo-Colo footballers
Deportes Temuco footballers
Santiago Morning footballers
Club Deportivo Universidad Católica footballers
Deportes La Serena footballers
J2 League players
Mito HollyHock players
Chilean expatriate sportspeople in Japan
Expatriate footballers in Japan
Association football midfielders